Saint-Cierge-la-Serre is a commune in the Ardèche department in the Rhône Valley in southern France.

Population

See also
Communes of the Ardèche department

References

External links

 Saint-Cierge-la-Serre website

Communes of Ardèche
Ardèche communes articles needing translation from French Wikipedia